Russell Charles Anderson (born 21 April 1951) is a former Australian politician. Born in Williamstown, Victoria, he later moved to Tasmania. In 1998, he was elected to the Tasmanian Legislative Council as the Independent member for Macquarie. He held the seat until its abolition in 1999.

He contested Lyons for the Liberal Party at the 1996 federal election.

References

1951 births
Living people
Independent members of the Parliament of Tasmania
Members of the Tasmanian Legislative Council
20th-century Australian politicians
People from Williamstown, Victoria
Politicians from Melbourne